Lucas René Olaza Catrofe (born 21 July 1994) is a Uruguayan professional footballer who plays as a left back for Spanish club Real Valladolid.

Club career
Olaza was born in Montevideo. After graduating from River Plate's youth system, he made his professional debut on 19 February 2012, in a 3–2 away loss against Nacional.

On 7 January 2014, Olaza joined Brazilian Série A side Atlético Paranaense, in a season-long loan deal. He made his Série A debut on 20 April, playing the last 23 minutes in a 1–0 home win against Grêmio.

On 29 July 2015, Olaza moved to La Liga side RC Celta de Vigo, initially assigned to the reserves in Segunda División B. After his loan ended, he returned to his home country and joined Danubio.

On 27 July 2017, Olaza agreed to a three-year deal with Talleres de Córdoba, as the club bought 70% of his federative rights. On 1 August of the following year, he moved to fellow Argentine Primera División side Boca Juniors, helping the side reach the 2018 Copa Libertadores Finals.

On 31 January 2019, Olaza returned to Celta, now being assigned to the main squad after agreeing to a six-month loan. He made his debut for Celta on 30 March 2019, starting in a 3–2 win against Villarreal, where he provided the assist for the second goal. He remained an integral part of the starting XI from this point, eventually helping the team to escape relegation on the final matchday. Following his decent performances, his loan was extended to another year on 2 July 2019. 

On 1 February 2021, Olaza joined Real Valladolid on loan until the end of the season. The move was made permanent in the summer of 2021, as he signed a contract until June 2025.

On 31 January 2022, Olaza returned to the top tier after agreeing to a loan deal with Elche CF, with a buyout clause.

International career
On 21 October 2022, Olaza was named in Uruguay's 55-man preliminary squad for the 2022 FIFA World Cup.

Career statistics

Club

Honours
Uruguay U20
FIFA U-20 World Cup: 2013 Runner-up

References

External links

1994 births
Living people
Footballers from Montevideo
Association football defenders
Uruguayan footballers
Uruguay under-20 international footballers
Uruguayan Primera División players
Campeonato Brasileiro Série A players
Segunda División B players
Argentine Primera División players
La Liga players
Club Atlético River Plate (Montevideo) players
Club Athletico Paranaense players
Celta de Vigo B players
Danubio F.C. players
Talleres de Córdoba footballers
Boca Juniors footballers
RC Celta de Vigo players
Real Valladolid players
Elche CF players
Uruguayan expatriate footballers
Uruguayan expatriate sportspeople in Brazil
Uruguayan expatriate sportspeople in Spain
Uruguayan expatriate sportspeople in Argentina
Expatriate footballers in Brazil
Expatriate footballers in Spain
Expatriate footballers in Argentina